"Ahead of My Time" is a song performed by Teddybears featuring Daddy Boastin'. The song was released on their 2000 album Rock 'n' Roll Highschool, and reissued on their 2006 album Soft Machine. It was released as a single in 1999.

Content
Teddybears use heavy distorted guitar riffs and dub reggae beats which are incorporated into the song.

Track listing
 CD single
 "Ahead of My Time " (featuring Daddy Boastin') – 4:10

In the media
In 2009, Telus used the track "Ahead of My Time" in their 'Downtime' TV advertisement.
In the movie, The Air I Breathe (2007)
In a series of Telus commercials, Canada-Wide, spring 2009
In the TV series Life season 1 episode 11 (2007)

References

External links
 Allmusic.com
 Youtube.com
 Last.fm
 Allmusic.com

Teddybears (band) songs
2000 songs
Songs written by Klas Åhlund
Songs written by Joakim Åhlund